Stafford William Thomas Castledine (10 April 1912 – 17 April 1986) was an English cricketer.  Castledine was a right-handed batsman who bowled slow left-arm orthodox.  He was born in Bingham, Nottinghamshire.

Castledine made his first-class debut for Nottinghamshire against the touring West Indians in 1933. His debut in the County Championship came when Nottinghamshire played Warwickshire in 1934 County Championship. During the 1934 season, he represented the county in 3 further first-class matches, the last of which came against Sussex. In his 5 first-class matches, he scored 22 runs at a batting average of 3.14, with a high score of 15. In the field he took 6 catches.

He died at Nottingham on 17 April 1986.

References

External links
Stafford Castledine at Cricinfo
Stafford Castledine at CricketArchive

1912 births
1986 deaths
People from Bingham, Nottinghamshire
Cricketers from Nottinghamshire
English cricketers
Nottinghamshire cricketers